Shadow Records was launched in 1995 as a sub-label of Instinct Records, with a focus on the more organic side of the underground electronic music scene. The label's first release in 1995, Abstrackt Workshop, featured performances by DJ Krush, Funki Porcini, and Marden Hill in addition to songs from labels like Pussyfoot and Yellow Productions.

The next step included a 2-year involvement with the UK beat label Ninja Tune. This partnership introduced the likes of Funki Porcini, DJ Food, 9 Lazy 9, Up, Bustle and Out, Hedfunk, and London Funk Allstars to U.S. audiences.

Shadow went on to release U.S. debut CDs from DJ Krush, DJ Cam, Cujo, Shantel, James Hardway and Ollano. Shadow Records has also brought an array of artists to the US, having worked with such European underground labels as Stereo Deluxe, Freerange, Cup Of Tea, Five Star Recordings, Recordings Of Substance, Hospital, nineBAR, Infracom, and DiY.

Shadow continues with exploration into the experimental side of electronic music, with a series of mix CDs from the likes of DJ Cam, Kruder & Dorfmeister and Jimpster. Future mix CDs include Jack Dangers (Meat Beat Manifesto, Tino Corp.), and Carl Craig.

Adventures in Foam controversy

Following Amon Tobin's (formerly Cujo) success with Bricolage under Ninja Tune, Shadow Records re-released Adventures in Foam, an earlier album of the artist's, with unapproved artwork and mistitled tracks. Such was the discrepancy that Ninja Tune saw fit to produce its own re-release in 2002, stating its position on Shadow Records' conduct rather harshly in the process.

Artists

 The 13th Sign
 808 State
 9 Lazy 9
 Alphazone (US)
 Anthea
 Blend
 Bluescreen
 Carl Craig
 Count Basic
 Cujo
 Da Germ
 Deadly Avenger
 Differenz
 Digital Alkemist
 disJam
 DJ Cam
 DJ Food
 DJ Krush
 DJ Spooky That Subliminal Kid
 Droid
 Echostar
 Funki Porcini
 Frost
 Fugitive Elf
 Futique
 Goo
 Greg Long

 Hedfunk
 Hybrid Device
 Illform / Quentin's Ladder
Jimpster
 Justice
 Le Gooster
 London Funk Allstars
 Magnetic
 Marschmellows
 Mujaji
 Nostramus
 Obo
 The Odd Toot
 Ollano
 The Poets Of Rhythm
 Raucous a/k/a Sabotage
 Saru
 Sector
 Shantel
 Sharpshooters
 Shawn Francis
 Spaceways
 Trigga Rick
 Ultralights
 Up, Bustle & Out

Compilations
 Abstract Workshop - A Collection Of Trip Hop And Jazz (1995, SDW-12002-1/SDW001-2, 2xLP/CD)
 Five Star Galaxy Part One (1995, SDW020-2, CD)
 Ninja Tune USA - If Ya Can't Stand Da Beatz, Git Outta Da Kitchen (1996, SDW008-2, 2xCD)
 Abstrakt Workshop 2 (1996, SDW009-2, CD)
 Earthrise.Ninja.2 (1996, SDW-12010-1/SDW013-2, 12"/2xCD)
 Blunted: The Edinburgh Project (1996, SDW016-2, CD)
 Pure Abstrakt (1996, SDW019-2, CD)
 Five Star Galaxy Part 1 (1996, UR 21CD, CD)
 Five Star Galaxy Part Two: The Galaxy Strikes Back (1997, SDW023-2, CD)
 Blunted 2 (1997, SDW024-2, CD)
 Earthrise.Shadow.3 (1997, SDW026-2, CD)
 Joint Ventures (1997, SDW032-2, CD)
 State Of The Nu-Art (1997, SDW033-2, CD)
 Rewired Rhythms (1998, SDW034-2, CD)
 Songs Of The Siren (1998, SDW036-2, CD)
 State Of The Nu-Art Volume 2 (1998, SDW041-2, CD)
 Pure Abstrakt - Adventures In Dub (1998, SDW042-2, CD)
 Next Step Drum-n-Bass (1998, SDW043-2, CD)
 Cinematique, Scenes From a Movie (1998, SDW045-2, CD)
 Theatre Of Sound (1998, SDW047-2, CD)
 Conversions - A K&D Selection (1999, SDW051-2, CD)
 Drum 'N' Bass Conspiracy (1999, SDW053-2, CD)
 DiY Served Chilled (1999, SDW054-2, CD)
 Still Searchin (1999, SDW055-2, CD)
 Songs Of The Siren 2 (1999, SDW056-2, CD)
 Earthrise.Back.2.The.Beat (1999, SDW058-2, CD)
 Freebass Breakz And Sub Phunk Beats (1999, SDW060-2, CD)
 Rewired Rhythms 2 (1999, SDW062-2, CD)
 Beatz By Design (1999, SDW066-2, CD)
 Scrambled (2000, SDW080-2, CD)
 Blunted (2000, SDW093-2, CD)
 Ninja Tune: The Shadow Years (2001, SDW094-2, 2xCD)
 Shadow: Hard Sessions (2001, SDW095-2, CD)
 ¡Hello Friends! (2001, SDW097-2, CD)
 Shadow: Hed Sessions (2001, SDW099-2, CD)
 Si-Con (2001, SDW100-2, CD)
 Mainhatten Sound (2001, SDW108-2, CD)
 Through Rose Tinted Glasses (2001, SDW109-2, CD)
 Mush Filmstrip (Frame 1) (2001, SDW111-2, CD)
 Gomma Audio No. 1 (2001, SDW114-2, CD)
 Munich Manhattan (2001, SDW119-2, CD)
 Blunted 3 (2001, SDW120-2, CD)
 Elf Soulbound (2001, SDW121-2, CD)
 Undercurrents (2001, SDW122-2, CD)
 What Goes 'Round(2002, SDW12021, CD)
 The Yellow Room(2002, SDW126-2, CD)
 Shadow: Trance Sessions(2002, SDW127-2, CD)
 Modern Mantra Unmixed Vinyl Version (2002, SDW12021, 12")
 Audio.nl (2002, SDW131-2, CD)
 Shadow Masters New, Used, & Absurd (2002, SDW134-2, 2xCD)
 Hard Sessions 2 (2002, SDW136-2, CD)
 Hed Sessions 2 (2002, SDW153-2, CD)
 Dubtribe Sound System Vs. Chillifunk Recordings: Heavyweight Soundclash (2002, SDW154-2, CD)

See also
 List of record labels

References

External links
 Official website
 Instinct Records Official Website
 
 Mafiagato's Ninja Obsession
 Discography at Rolldabeats.com
  - Ninja Tune explanation of Adventures in Foam re- re-release

American record labels
Record labels established in 1995
Electronic music record labels
Instinct Records